Juan de Mariana, also known as Father Mariana (25 September 1536 – 17 February 1624), was a Spanish Jesuit priest, Scholastic, historian, and member of the Monarchomachs.

Life
Juan de Mariana was born in Talavera, Kingdom of Toledo. He studied at the Complutense University of Alcalá de Henares and was admitted at the age of 17 into the Society of Jesus.

In 1561, he went to teach theology in Rome, reckoning among his pupils Robert Bellarmine, afterwards cardinal; then passed into Sicily; and in 1569 he was sent to Paris, where his expositions of the writings of Thomas Aquinas attracted large audiences. In 1574, owing to ill health, he obtained permission to return to Spain; the rest of his life being passed at the Jesuits' house in Toledo in vigorous literary activity.  He died in Madrid.

Works
Mariana's great work, Historiae de rebus Hispaniae, first appeared in twenty books at Toledo in 1592; ten books were subsequently added (1605), bringing the work down to the accession of Charles V in 1519, and in a still later abstract of events the author completed it to the accession of Philip IV in 1621. It was so well received that Mariana was induced to translate it into Spanish (the first part in 1601; completed, 1609; English translation by J. Stevens, 1699).

Mariana's Historiae, though in many parts uncritical, is regarded for its research, accuracy, sagacity and style. Of his other works the most interesting is the treatise De rege et regis institutione (On the king and the royal institution, Toledo, 1598). In its sixth chapter the question whether it is lawful to overthrow a tyrant is freely discussed and answered in the affirmative, a circumstance which brought much odium upon the Jesuits, especially after the assassination of Henry IV of France, in 1610. A volume entitled Tractatus VII. theologici et historici (published by Mariana in Cologne in 1609, containing in particular a tract, De morte et immortalitate, and another, De monetae mutatione (On the Alteration of Money)) was put upon the Index Expurgatorius, and led to the confinement of its author by the Inquisition. It has been suggested that either the De rege et regis institutione or the De monetae mutatione influenced Chapter 29 of Part One of Cervantes's Don Quijote. During his confinement there was found among his papers a criticism upon the Jesuits, which was printed after his death as Discursus de erroribus qui in forma gubernationis societatis Jesu occurrunt (A discourse on the sickness of the Jesuit order, Bordeaux, 1625), and was reprinted by order of Charles III when he banished the Jesuits from Spain.

According to Marjorie Grice-Hutchinson, an academic economist specializing in the School of Salamanca, Juan de Mariana and the Spanish scholastics provided much of the theoretical basis for Austrian School economic thought.

Works in English translation
 "A Treatise on the Alteration of Money," Journal of Markets and Morality, Vol. V, No. 2, Fall 2002.
 "On the Coinage," Quarterly Journal of Austrian Economics, Vol. XXI, No. 2, Summer 2018.

See also
 Gabriel Biel
 Francisco Suárez

Bibliography
 Braun, Harald Ernst. Juan De Mariana And Early Modern Spanish Political Thought, Ashgate Publishing, Ltd., 2007.
 Cirot, Georges. Etudes sur les Historiographes Espagnols; Mariana, Historien, Bordeaux: Feret & Fils, 1904.
 Fernandez, Angel. "Property and Subjective Rights in Juan de Mariana," MPRA Paper, No. 25932, October 2010.
 Graf, Eric Clifford. "Sancho Panza's 'por negros que sean, los he de volver blancos o amarillos' (DQ 1.29) and Juan de Mariana's De moneta of 1605." Cervantes: Bulletin of the Cervantes Society of America 31.2 (2011): 23–51.
 Grice-Hutchinson, Marjorie. The School of Salamanca: Readings in Spanish Monetary Theory, 1544 1605, Oxford: Clarendon Press, 1952.
 Laures, John. The Political Economy of Juan de Mariana, Fordham University Press, 1928.
 Lewy, Guenter. Constitutionalism and Statecraft during the Golden Age of Spain: A Study of the Political Philosophy of Juan de Mariana, S.J., E. Droz, 1960.
 Renaud Malavialle (dir.), De l’éducation du prince à la critique du pouvoir : le jésuite Juan de Mariana (1536–1624) ou l’art de la composition, dossier monographique publié dans e-Spania, revue interdisciplinaire d'études hispaniques médiévales et modernes, n°31, octobre 2018.
 Renaud Malavialle, « Éducation du prince et pensée politique chez le jésuite Juan Mariana (1536–1624). La familiarité au risque de l’intimité d’après le De rege et regis institutione (1599) », e-Spania [En ligne], 37 | octobre 2020. Éducation du prince et pensée politique chez le jésuite Juan Mariana (1536–1624). La familiarité au risque de l’intimité d’après le De rege et regis institutione (1599) ; 
 Moss, Laurence, and Christopher Ryan, eds. Economic Thought in Spain. Cheltenham, UK: Edward Elgar, 1993.
 Ranke, L. von, Zur Kritik neuerer Geschichtsschreibung, Leipzig, 1874.
 Rothbard, Murray. Economic Thought before Adam Smith, Edward Elgar Publishing Ltd., 1995.
 Smith, Gerard (ed). Jesuit Thinkers of the Renaissance, Marquette University Press, 1939, pp. 157–192.
 Soons, Alan. Juan de Mariana, Twayne Pub., 1982.

References

External links
 Instituto Juan de Mariana, the website of the Instituto Juan de Mariana
 Obras del Padre Juan de Mariana, Vol. 2
 

17th-century Spanish historians
16th-century Spanish Jesuits
1536 births
1624 deaths
Monarchomachs
17th-century Spanish Jesuits
Austrian School economists
School of Salamanca
Lycée Louis-le-Grand teachers
16th-century Spanish historians